Michael D. Bishop may refer to:
 Michael Bishop, Baron Glendonbrook (born 1942), British businessman and politician
 Mike Bishop (politician) (born 1967), American politician
 Mike Bishop (baseball) (1958–2005), Major League Baseball player